Arthur-Lucien Beaubien (February 11, 1879 – March 21, 1971) was a Canadian politician and farmer.

Born in Arthabaska, Quebec, he was elected to the House of Commons of Canada in the 1921 election as a member of the Progressive Party to represent the riding or electoral district of Provencher. He was re-elected in 1925, and in 1926 (by acclamation) and 1930 as a Liberal Progressive. He was then re-elected in 1935 as he switched to the Liberal Party.

In 1940, he was appointed to the Senate of Canada upon the advice of Mackenzie King to the senate division of Provencher, Manitoba. He was made Government Whip in the Senate in 1951 until 1957. He became the Senate Opposition Whip in 1958 until 1962 then served another term as Senate Government Whip from 1964 to 1969.

Beaubien also served on various standing committees. He was chair of the Special Committee on the Canadian Radio Broadcasting Commission during the 18th Parliament. He sat on the Standing Joint Committee on the Parliamentary Restaurant, during the 18th Parliament as well as numerous Senate committees. Prior to his federal political experience, he was reeve of Montcalm, Manitoba in 1921.

Electoral history

References
 

1879 births
1971 deaths
Canadian senators from Manitoba
Liberal Party of Canada senators
Liberal Party of Canada MPs
Liberal-Progressive MPs
Members of the House of Commons of Canada from Manitoba
Progressive Party of Canada MPs